The Best of Allan Holdsworth: Against the Clock is a double compilation album by guitarist Allan Holdsworth, released on 17 May 2005 through Universal Music (Japan), Alternity Records (US) and JMS–Cream Records (Europe). The second disc contains predominantly SynthAxe-based compositions, which formed the basis of much of Holdsworth's recordings in the late 1980s and 1990s.

Track listing

Disc one

Disc two

Personnel

Allan Holdsworth – guitar, SynthAxe, spoken vocals (track 9), production
Naomi Star – vocals (track 17)
Rowanne Mark – vocals (tracks 19, 22)
Steve Hunt – keyboard (tracks 2–4, 21)
Chad Wackerman – keyboard (track 9), drums (tracks 1, 7–9, 16, 22, 25), production
Alan Pasqua – keyboard (tracks 11, 13)
William Edward Childs – keyboard (track 12)
Gordon Beck – digital piano (tracks 5, 6)
Gary Husband – drums (tracks 2–4, 11, 13, 21
Kirk Covington – drums (tracks 5, 6)
Gary Novak – drums (tracks 10, 23)
Tony Williams – drums (track 12)
Vinnie Colaiuta – drums (tracks 14, 17, 19)
Jimmy Johnson – bass (tracks 1, 2, 7, 8, 11–14, 17, 19, 22, 25)
Skúli Sverrisson – bass (tracks 3, 4, 21)
Gary Willis – bass (tracks 5, 6)
Bob Wackerman – bass (track 9)
Dave Carpenter – bass (tracks 10, 18, 20, 23)
Biff Vincent – Roland Octapad (track 16)
Claire Holdsworth – spoken vocals (track 9)
Jeffrey Ocheltree – sound effects (track 9)
John England – sound effects (track 16)
Derek Wilson – executive production
Christopher Hoard – executive production

References

External links
In Review: Allan Holdsworth "Against The Clock" at Guitar Nine Records

Allan Holdsworth albums
2005 greatest hits albums